Folly's Lane is a woodland in Herefordshire, England, near the village of Luston. It is owned and managed by the Woodland Trust.

References

Forests and woodlands of Herefordshire